Tempe is a city in Maricopa County, Arizona, United States, with the Census Bureau reporting a 2020 population of 180,587.  The city is named after the Vale of Tempe in Greece. Tempe is located in the East Valley section of metropolitan Phoenix; it is bordered by Phoenix and Guadalupe on the west, Scottsdale and the Salt River Pima–Maricopa Indian Community on the north, Chandler on the south, and Mesa on the east.  Tempe is also the location of the main campus of Arizona State University.

History

The Hohokam lived in this area and built canals to support their agriculture. They abandoned their settlements during the 15th century, with a few individuals and families remaining nearby.

US military service members and Hispanic workers were hired to grow food and animal feed to supply the fort, and less than a year later, had set up small camps near the river that were the first permanent communities in the Valley after the fall of the Hohokam. (Phoenix was settled shortly afterward, by 1867–68.) The two settlements were 'Hayden's Ferry', named after a ferry service operated by Charles T. Hayden, and 'San Pablo', and were located west and east of Hayden Butte respectively. The ferry became the key river crossing in the area. The Tempe Irrigating Canal Company was soon established by William Kirkland and James McKinney to provide water for alfalfa, wheat, barley, oats, and cotton.

Pioneer Darrell Duppa is credited with suggesting Tempe's name, adopted in 1879, after comparing the Salt River valley near a -tall butte, to the Vale of Tempe near Mount Olympus in Greece.

Until the early 1960s, Tempe was a sundown town where African Americans were permitted to work but encouraged to live elsewhere. In 1965, Warren and Carol Livingston were the first African Americans to buy property in Tempe.

In 1885, the 13th Arizona Territorial Legislature chose Tempe for the site of the Territorial Normal School, which became Arizona Normal School, Arizona State Teachers College, Arizona State College and finally Arizona State University.

The Maricopa and Phoenix Railroad, built in 1887, crossed the Salt River at Tempe, linking the town to the nation's growing transportation system. The Tempe Land and Improvement Company was formed to sell lots in the booming town. Tempe became an economic hub for the surrounding agricultural area. The city incorporated in 1894.

The completion of Roosevelt Dam in 1911 guaranteed enough water to meet the growing needs of Valley farmers. On his way to dedicate the dam, former President Theodore Roosevelt applauded the accomplishments of the people of central Arizona and predicted that their towns would be prosperous cities in the future. Less than a year later, Arizona was admitted as the 48th state, and the Salt River Valley continued to develop.

In 1971, Tempe was hit by a rare F2 tornado that injured 41 people, the most injuries recorded from a tornado in Arizona, and caused damage in upwards of $3 million. One indirect fatality occurred when a man died from a heart attack during the storm.

In the 20th and 21st centuries, Tempe has expanded as a suburb of Phoenix, and as a center of education and commerce.

Geography
Tempe is an inner suburb, located between the core city of Phoenix and the rest of the East Valley. Due to this as well as being the home of the main campus of Arizona State University, Tempe has a fairly dense, urbanized development pattern in the northern part of the city especially in relation to the Valley Metro Line . Going south, development becomes less dense, consisting of single-family homes, strip malls and lower-density office parks.

The Salt River runs west through the northern part of Tempe; part of the river is dammed in two places to create Tempe Town Lake.

The total area is 0.32% water, including Tempe Town Lake. The city of Tempe is bordered by Mesa to the east, Scottsdale and the Salt River Pima–Maricopa Indian Community to the north, Phoenix and Guadalupe to the west, and Chandler to the south.

Tempe is generally flat, except for Tempe Butte or Hayden Butte (generally known as A-Mountain for Arizona State University's "A" logo located on its south face), located next to Sun Devil Stadium, Twin Buttes and Bell Butte on the western edge of Tempe, and the buttes within Papago Park at northwest corner of Tempe.

Climate
Tempe experiences a  desert climate with a higher degree of diurnal temperature variation than neighboring Phoenix.

Demographics

As of the 2010 census, there were 161,719 people, 63,602 households, and 33,645 families residing in the city. The racial makeup of the city was 77.5% White, 5.9% Black or African American, 2.9% Native American, 5.7% Asian, 0.4% Pacific Islander, 8.5% from other races, and 3.9% from two or more races. 21.2% of the population were Hispanic or Latino of any race.

There were 63,602 households, out of which 24.4% had children under the age of 18 living with them, 38.4% were married couples living together, 9.7% had a female householder with no husband present, and 47.1% were non-families. 28.5% of all households were made up of individuals, and 4.6% had someone living alone who was 65 years of age or older. The average household size was 2.41 and the average family size was 3.05.

In the city, 19.8% of the population was under the age of 18, 21.3% from 18 to 24, 33.2% from 25 to 44, 18.5% from 45 to 64, and 7.2% who were 65 years of age or older. The median age was 29 years. For every 100 females, there were 106.9 males. For every 100 females age 18 and over, there were 107.1 males.

The median income for a household in the city was $42,361, and the median income for a family was $55,237. Males had a median income of $36,406 versus $28,605 for females. The per capita income for the city was $22,406. About 7.5% of families and 14.3% of the population were below the poverty line, including 13.6% of those under age 18 and 5.1% of those age 65 or over.

Economy

Tempe is the headquarters and executive office of one Fortune 500 company: DriveTime. Carvana, NortonLifeLock, First Solar, the Salt River Project, Circle K, and Fulton Homes are also headquartered in Tempe. Cold Stone Creamery was originally headquartered in Tempe and location #0001 is still in operation today at 3330 S McClintock Drive in Tempe. Tempe prides itself in assisting burgeoning businesses and has a variety of resources and programs available, such as FABRiC (Fashion and Business Resource Innovation Center) and BRiC (Business Resource and Innovation Center). Tempe is also home to the first and largest campus of Arizona State University. It was the longtime host of the Fiesta Bowl, although the BCS game moved to University of Phoenix Stadium, located in Glendale, in 2007. It then began hosting the Insight Bowl which is now known as the Guaranteed Rate Bowl. As of 2018, there is no bowl game in Tempe because of renovations to Sun Devil Stadium. Edward Jones Investments and State Farm Insurance have regional headquarters in Tempe.

Tempe houses several performance venues including Gammage Auditorium and the Tempe Center for the Arts.

Tempe Town Lake is home to many national and international events, such as Ironman Arizona and Rock n Roll Marathon. Gammage Auditorium was also the site of one of the three Presidential debates in 2004, and Super Bowl XXX was played at Sun Devil Stadium. Additionally, Tempe is the spring training host city of the Los Angeles Angels of Anaheim.

One of Arizona's largest shopping malls, Arizona Mills, sits near the border with the town of Guadalupe. The city was the location of the first IKEA branch in Arizona, also near the southern boundary. Tempe Marketplace, a large open air mall featuring live music and water and laser shows, is located just southeast of Tempe Town Lake. Tempe can boast an array of wholesalers and manufacturers. Mill Avenue, located just west of Hayden Butte, is a shopping and entertainment area in the city popular with pedestrians and students. With the completion of Tempe Town Lake, commercial and high-rise development along the reservoir quickly transformed the cityscape of Mill Avenue and the skyline of downtown Tempe.

Top employers
According to Tempe's Comprehensive Annual Financial Report for the financial year ending June 2020, the top employers in the city are:

Arts and culture

Tempe Center for the Arts

Opened in September 2007, Tempe Center for the Arts (TCA) is a community crown jewel for performing and visual arts. The $65 million venue houses a state-of-the-art 600-seat theater, a 200-seat studio theater, a picturesque 200-seat multi-purpose space, a 3,500 square-foot art gallery.

Tempe History Museum
The Tempe History Museum explores local history through collections, research services, exhibits, and programs.

Public Art
The Tempe Public Art Program coordinates artists with building designers to install permanent and temporary public art projects. Since 1988, more than 50 projects have been commissioned by the Tempe's Community Services Division. The Art in Private Development ordinance of 1991 has helped add more than 60 privately owned pieces of art to the city, accessible by the public.

Live music scene
Tempe enjoyed a thriving alternative music scene throughout the 1980s and '90s, producing acts including as the Gin Blossoms, Meat Puppets, Dead Hot Workshop, The Refreshments, Roger Clyne and the Peacemakers, Hans Olson, The Maine, and Injury Reserve. Historic dive-bar Yucca Tap Room, one of the last remaining 'small stage' venues that defined this era, continues to host nightly local live music.

Tempe Music Walk
The Tempe Music Walk honors select bands, musicians and musical venues with plaques embedded in the sidewalk on Mill Avenue. Honorees are Walt Richardson, The Gin Blossoms, Hans Olson, and Long Wong's.

Public libraries
Tempe Public Library is the local library.

Tourism
Many of the reasons people visit Tempe are places and events, such as P. F. Chang's Rock 'n' Roll Arizona Marathon & 1/2 Marathon, Tempe Marketplace, Arizona Mills, Mill Avenue, and Tempe Town Lake.

The Tempe Tourism Office, located on Mill Avenue's downtown district, provides maps and additional information about hotels and upcoming city events.

Historic properties

There are numerous properties in the city of Tempe which are considered to be historical and have been included either in the National Register of Historic Places.

Sports

There is one major league professional sports team playing in Tempe: The Arizona Coyotes, who currently play their games at Mullett Arena. Also, from 1988 to 2005, Sun Devil Stadium hosted the Arizona Cardinals (named the Phoenix Cardinals from 1988 to 1993) of the National Football League. They have since moved to State Farm Stadium in Glendale for games, but maintain their headquarters and training facility in Tempe. Many residents follow the teams in nearby Phoenix and Glendale. (For more information, read the sports section on the Phoenix page)

The Arizona State University Sun Devils compete in football, basketball, baseball, as well as a number of other sports in the Pac-12 Conference of the NCAA. The Sun Devils football team plays their games at Sun Devil Stadium. Their nearest rival is the University of Arizona Wildcats, in Tucson. The two teams compete in the "Duel in the Desert" for control of the Territorial Cup. The Sun Devil Stadium had hosted the annual Fiesta Bowl, until the 2007 game moved to the new University of Phoenix Stadium in Glendale.

The Los Angeles Angels have their spring training at Tempe Diablo Stadium. Tempe Diablo Stadium was built in 1968 and holds 9,785 people. The Angels moved to Tempe in 1993 from Palm Springs, California.

The Arizona Hotshots of the Alliance of American Football played their one season in Tempe in early 2019. The league folded before the season was completed.

Rugby union is a developing sport in Tempe as well as in the Phoenix metropolitan area.  The multiple clubs, ranging from men's and women's clubs to collegiate and Under 19, are part of the Arizona Rugby Union. Notable clubs are Arizona State University Rugby Football Club and the Tempe "Old Devils" Rugby Club.

Parks and recreation

Tempe is home to many outdoor activities. Tempe Town Lake is a publicly accessible lake that is run by City of Tempe. The lake provides recreation activities to residents and tourists, but also helps protect the surrounding area from flooding. The City of Tempe estimated that 2.7 million people visited the lake in 2013. Papago and South Mountain Parks offer hiking, mountain and road biking, rock climbing, disc golf, and equestrian activities. In the downtown area of Tempe (at ASU campus) the 300 foot tall Tempe Butte hosts several hiking and cycling trails. Tempe is also home to the annual Ironman Triathlon, which takes place in late November.

Government

 Mayor: Corey Woods
 Vice Mayor: Jennifer Adams
 City Manager: Andrew Ching
 Chief of Police: Jeff Glover
 Fire Chief: Greg Ruiz

 City Attorney: Sonia Blain
 City Council Members: Vice Mayor Jennifer Adams, Arlene Chin, Doreen Garlid, Berdetta Hodge, Randy Keating, and Joel Navarro.

The city has had 33 mayors since 1894.

 1894–1896: Fenn J. Hart
 1896–1897: E.A. Murphy
 1897–1902: John Knight
 1902–1903: Samuel Brown
 1903–1912: J.A. Dins
 1912–1914: Joseph T. Birchett
 1914–1916: George M. Frizzell
 1916–1920: J.A. Dins
 1920–1922: C.M. Woodward
 1922–1924: Curt W. Miller
 1924–1926: Garfield A. Goodwin

 1926–1928: J.L. Felton
 1928–1930: Hugh E. Laird
 1930–1932: Thanks Anderson
 1932–1934: F.E. Ostrander
 1934–1937: Thanks Anderson
 1937–1948: W.W. Cole
 1948–1960: Hugh E. Laird
 1960–1961: Clyde Gililland
 1961–1962: Ross R. Rice
 1962–1963: Bernard R. Caine
 1963–1964: Harold Andrews

 1964–1966: John C. Moeur
 1966–1968: Rudy E. Campbell
 1968–1970: Elmer Bradley
 1970–1974: Dale R. Shumway
 1974–1978: William J. LoPiano
 1978–1994: Harry Mitchell
 1994–2004: Neil Giuliano
 2004–2012: Hugh Hallman
 2012–2020: Mark Mitchell
 2020–present: Corey Woods

Tempe is in Arizona's 9th Congressional District, served by Representative Greg Stanton (D).

Education
Tempe is served by multiple school districts. Most of Tempe is within the Tempe Elementary School District and the Tempe Union High School District; however, other portions are served by the Kyrene School District (K–8), Scottsdale Unified School District (K–12), and Mesa Public Schools (K–12). James Madison Preparatory School and Tempe Preparatory Academy are also located in the area.

Emmanuel Lutheran School is a Christian Pre-K–8 grade school of the Wisconsin Evangelical Lutheran Synod in Tempe.

Tempe also contains one of the state's three major universities, Arizona State University, the Maricopa County Community College District administrative offices and the headquarters of Rio Salado Community College. Arizona State University is known for its numerous studies and innovations, particularly in the field of science which include furthering the knowledge of certain cancers, business management research, and population science. Tempe is also the home of several other schools, including the University of Phoenix, Brookline College, Southwest College of Naturopathic Medicine, Southwest Institute of Healing Arts, Bryan University and Lamson Junior College.

Media
 Tempe 11, a local access channel, found on Cox Cable Channel 11.
 KJZZ, an NPR station, is located in Tempe at Rio Salado College.
 KBAQ, a 24/7 member-supported classical radio station, is the only such service in the Phoenix metropolitan area. Sun Sounds, a radio station for the blind, is also located there.
 East Valley Tribune, a print newspaper, has offices in Tempe.
 College Times, a weekly entertainment magazine serving the Phoenix metropolitan area and 20 Maricopa County colleges, including Arizona State University.

Infrastructure

Transportation

Tempe is one of the most densely populated cities in the state and serves as a crossroads for the area's largest communities.

Freeways make up the major transportation system for the Valley. Included in the system surrounding Tempe are Interstate 10 near the western edge as it traverses the Broadway Curve, Loop 202 crossing the northern side, Loop 101 following the eastern border, and U.S. Route 60 running east–west through the center of the city.

Valley Metro operates bus routes and the Valley Metro Rail system that serves Downtown Tempe and Arizona State University, providing service to Phoenix and Mesa. The City of Tempe operates a free neighborhood circulator service called Orbit involving five free shuttle routes near Arizona State University that operate on a regular basis seven days a week. Three other FLASH (Free Local Area Shuttle) circulate in northern Tempe around the university. Tempe residents and commuters make extensive use of public transit and service is offered on a more frequent basis than elsewhere in the greater Phoenix valley, or in the entire state. Most Tempe buses offer 15 minute service during rush hour and 30 minute service throughout the rest of the day.

Phoenix-Mesa Gateway Airport is located in Mesa, and offers air service to many additional destinations.

Tempe was the location of the world's first reported killing of a pedestrian by a self-driving car on 19 March 2018. An Uber car under software control was driving at 38 mph on a 35 mph limit road when it collided with 49-year-old Elaine Herzberg who was crossing the road.

Tempe is developing the nation’s first zero-driving community called Culdesac Tempe set to open in 2023.  The $170 million development project will contain 761 apartments, housing 1,000 residents and 16,000 square feet of retail, serving as a form of infill development in the city as it is being built on a vacant 17-acre lot.  In this community, residents are contractually forbidden from parking a vehicle within a quarter mile radius of the area. Prices to live in Culdesac Tempe are projected to be similar to rent prices in the rest of the area and discounted public transport services are included in the monthly rent to allow for residents to travel to other places.

Notable people

 Steven Anderson – pastor of Faithful Word Baptist Church
 Jules Asner – television personality, model, author
 Roger Clyne – musician
 Norman Dubie – poet
 Gabe Freeman – professional basketball player
 Grady Gammage – educator, president of NAU and, after, ASU
 Gin Blossoms – rock band
 Margaret Gisolo – baseball pioneer, dance educator
 Carl T. Hayden – United States Senator for Arizona, and its first Representative in the House, was born in Tempe on October 2, 1877
 Katie Hobbs – 24th and current governor of Arizona since 2023
 Joe Jackson –  professional football player
 Frank Kush – college football coach
 Aaron McCreary – college baseball, basketball and football coach
 The Meat Puppets – rock band
 Harry E. Mitchell – former U.S. Representative who represented Arizona's 5th Congressional District from 2007 until 2011.
 Paul "P.H." Naffah – musician
 Mike Pollak – professional football player
 Psychostick – comedy rock band
 John H. Pyle – Governor of Arizona from 1951 to 1955.
 The Refreshments – alternative rock band
 Alberto Ríos – poet
 Charli Turner Thorne – college basketball coach

Twin towns and sister cities

  Beaulieu-sur-Mer, Alpes-Maritimes, Provence-Alpes-Côte d'Azur, France
  Carlow, Carlow, Ireland
  Lower Hutt, New Zealand
  Regensburg, Bavaria, Germany
  Skopje, North Macedonia
  Zhenjiang, Jiangsu, China
  Timbuktu, Mali
  Cuenca, Ecuador
  Cuzco, Peru
  Trollhättan, Sweden
  Agra City, India

The newest sister city is Agra City, India, since 2016.

See also

 List of historic properties in Tempe, Arizona
 List of historic properties in Glendale, Arizona
 List of historic properties in Chandler, Arizona
 List of historic properties in Phoenix, Arizona
 Double Butte Cemetery

References

Further reading
 Smith, Jared. The African American Experience in Tempe (Tempe History Museum and African American Advisory Committee, 2013).
 Sweeney, Jennifer. From" Open Country" to" Open Space": Park Planning, Rapid Growth and Community Identity in Tempe, Arizona, 1949–1975. (MA Thesis. Arizona State University, 2019), bibliography pp 121–140 online 
 Solliday, Scott. Tempe Post-World War II Context Study (December, 2001. Archived on City of Tempe Web site. online

External links

 Official government website
 Tempe news, sports and things to do from The Tempe Republic newspaper
 Official Tempe Convention & Visitors Bureau Website
 
 List of Tempe Neighborhoods
 

 
Populated places established in 1865
Cities in Arizona
Cities in Maricopa County, Arizona
Phoenix metropolitan area
Populated places in the Sonoran Desert
Sundown towns in the United States